

Concept and Design 
Elazığ Education Campus located in Elazığ Turkey will be the biggest campus on sentral and easters regions of Turkey. World known Turkish architect Günay Erdem and world known landscape architect Sunay Erdem with the support of landscape architect Serpil Öztekin Erdem developed design for the campus.

Quick Facts 
Total Plot Area: 220,000 m2
Total Buildings Area: 120,000 m2
Functions: classroom, common education area, forum, laboratory, library, administrative unit, stadium, sports center, indoor swimming pool, dormitory, amphitheater, refectory, student clubs area, mosque, kindergarten
Project Cost: $50 million
Population: 10.000 students

External links 
 Official web site
 Erdem Architects official Facebook page 
 Gunay Erdem-Arkitera
 Turkish architects entrusted the future of New York
 Architects Of Future
 Turkish architects design peace islands to replace La Spezia war arsenal
 Erdem Architects Gets First Prize in La Spezia Arsenale 2062 Competition
 Identify a Public Space

References 

Universities and colleges in Turkey
Buildings and structures in Elazığ Province